Legislative elections were held in Argentina on 3 March 1940. Voter turnout was 70%.

Results

Results by province

References

1940 elections in South America
1940 in Argentina
Elections in Argentina
Infamous Decade
March 1940 events